Baba Rais (also Romanized as Bābā Ra’īs and Bābā Re’īs) is a village in Kuh Sardeh Rural District, in the Central District of Malayer County, Hamadan Province, Iran. At the 2006 census, its population was 592, in 141 families.

References 

Populated places in Malayer County